The Autovía A-316 is a highway in Andalusia, Spain.

The road starts at a junction with the N-322 at Úbeda.  It heads south west through the olive groves to Jaén crossing the Guadalquivir.  It ends with a junction with the N-432 at Alcaudete.  To the west the N-316 and A340 connect to the Autovía A-44.

References

External links

Transport in Andalusia
Autopistas and autovías in Spain